Limnochares americana is a species of mite in the family Limnocharidae.

References

Further reading

 
 
 
 
 
 
 

Trombidiformes